Education in Albany, Oregon, United States is coordinated by Greater Albany Public School District 8J (GAPS 8J). Established in 1979 and encompassing , this educational district aims to educate the children of Albany from grades K through 12. GAPS has an enrollment of just over 10,000 students.

School ratings
All schools are graded according to the Oregon Department of Education Annual Year Report and Report Card. All schools were graded as "satisfactory", with eight graded "strong" and one as "exceptional".

Faculty ratings
Nearly nine-tenths of educators within the GAPS district hold bachelor's degrees or educational certificates while one in two have a master's degree, including an overall total average teaching experience of more than five years.

Administration
The Superintendent is Rob Saxton. His predecessor  was Melissa Goff.

Albany schools

Elementary schools
Central Elementary School
Built in 1915.
Student body of approximately 200 students.
Grades 3–5; grades K-2 attend Takena.
Clover Ridge Elementary School
Established in 1914.
Student body of approximately 300 students.
Lafayette Elementary School
Established in 1960.
Approximately 400 students.
Liberty Elementary School
Established in 1949.
Approximately 425 students.
Located opposite Memorial MS and West Albany HS, next to Memorial Stadium.
North Albany Elementary School
Mileage Club, which rewards students for running during recess.
Only school rated "Exceptional" by the State in the 8J School District.
Established in 1906 & rebuilt in 1949.
Approximately 300 students.
Oak Elementary School
The Groves:  Fir & Oak Elementary Schools
Fir Grove houses kindergarten, first & second grade. Students in grades 3, 4 & 5 attend Oak Grove.
Grades: K-2 enroll approximately 160 students
Grades 3-5 enroll approximately 185 students
Oak Grove Intermediate School
Established in 1860.
Approximately 160 students.
Located on the city limits amidst farmland and residential areas.
Periwinkle Elementary School
Built in 1977.
Approximately 460 students.
South Shore Elementary School
Built in 1971.
Approximately 400 students.
Sunrise Elementary School
Established in 1949.
Approximately 450 students.
Takena Elementary School
Built in 1971.
Approximately 160 students.
Grades K-2; grades 3-5 attend Central.
Tangent Elementary School
Established in 1965.
Approximately 200 students.
Waverly Elementary School
Established in 1949
Approximately 240 students.

Middle schools
Calapooia MS
Built in 1962.
Student body of approximately 750 students.
Memorial MS
Established in 1963 next to West Albany High School.
Student body of approximately 665 students.
3 sports programs and over 5 clubs and groups.
North Albany MS
Established in North Albany in 1966.
Student body of approximately 600 students.
Reward/Incentive programs (Top Tiger, Gold Cards, Tiger Eyes Are On You) for exceptional attendance and final grades.

High schools
West Albany High School
Established 1953 as Albany Union High School
 campus includes 1/4 mile running track, Memorial Stadium, and large, grass, sports fields and softball and tennis courts.
Student body of approximately 1350 students.
Over 25 clubs and groups and over 10 athletic sports.
Mascot: Bulldog 
School colors: Navy & Gold
South Albany High School
Established in 1970 to meet the growing educational needs of Albany.
 of instructional space and supplemental buildings (this is the largest educational area within Albany)
Student body of approximately 1200 students.
Over 15 athletic sports and over 22 clubs and groups.
Owns and operates a community pool/aquatic facilities for South Albany High School and the Albany Community at large.
Mascot: RedHawks 
School colors: Red and Grey

Alternative schools
Albany Options School
Grades 6–12

See also
List of school districts in Oregon

External links
Greater Albany Public Schools 
Oregon Department of Education

References

Albany, Oregon
School districts in Oregon
Education in Linn County, Oregon
1979 establishments in Oregon
School districts established in 1979